Sweyn the Crusader;  1050 – 1097 at Philomelium (modern-day Akşehir, Turkey) was a Danish crusader.

Biography
Sweyn was born in Denmark, a son of King Sweyn II of Denmark, and husband of Florine of Burgundy. He is famous for his participation in the First Crusade, which he primarily spent fighting the Turks. On his way to Jerusalem in 1097, he and 1,500 other Danish knights were attacked by the Turks. The Danes lost the battle, and Sweyn the Crusader with his wife Florine of Burgundy was killed.

Ancestry

References

Source
 Albert von Aachen (12th century). Historia Hierosolymitanae expeditionis. Recueil des historiens des croisades (1879).

House of Estridsen
1050s births
1097 deaths
Danish princes
Christians of the First Crusade
Warriors of Europe
Illegitimate children of Sweyn II
11th-century Danish people
Sons of kings